Brunot may refer to:

Places
Brunot Island, a river island in Allegheny County, Pennsylvania, United States
Brunot, Missouri, an unincorporated community in Wayne County, Missouri, United States

People with the surname
André Brunot (1879–1973), French actor
Ferdinand Brunot (1860–1938), French linguist and philologist

French-language surnames